Spartak Chernihiv was a Ukrainian football club from Chernihiv, Ukraine established in 1938, during the Soviet Union. The team plated in the Sports complex, The stadium is located in Chernihiv at: Museum, 4 in Chernihiv, Chernihiv Oblast, Ukraine.

History

Origine
Football club "Spartak" was established at the XX century in the city of Chernihiv. In 1938, the rock team started in the SRCP Cup. In 1/4 of the final of the zonal stage, the technical gain over the Korosten teammates was taken away, and in the pivfinal, the Kyiv “Vodnik” received it Until the ear of Nimetsko-Radianskoy vіyny, having played in other and third groups championship of the URSR. In 1940 "Spartak" rotsi won the third group championship of the URSR. In 1949 and 1951 [8] he played rock music at the First Group championship of the URSR. Also playing in the cups URSR 1939, 1940, 1949, 1951 and 1964 rock_v. In 1964 the rotsi chernigivska team showed their best result in the tourney. In the first one, “Spartak” won (2: 1) “Gvardiya” (Romney), and in the second one, it sacrificed (0: 3) to the Terniv Avangard. The team was formed over the course of the year.

Honours
 Soviet Cup - 1/128 Quarterfinals (1): 1938
 Football Cup of the Ukrainian SSR: Zonal (regional) semifinals 1938
 Champion (1): 1940

League and cup history
{|class="wikitable"
|-bgcolor="#efefef"
! Season
! Div.
! Pos.
! Pl.
! W
! D
! L
! GS
! GA
! P
!Domestic Cup
!colspan=2|Europe
!Notes
|- bgcolor=darkgrey
|align=center|1937
|align=center|Union 7th / Rep 2nd
|align=center|
|align=center|
|align=center|
|align=center|
|align=center|
|align=center|
|align=center|
|align=center|
|align=center|
|align=center|
|align=center|
|align=center|withdrew after Round 1
|-
|align=center|1938
|align=center|Union 3rd / Rep 2nd
|align=center|4
|align=center|5
|align=center|2
|align=center|0
|align=center|3
|align=center|10
|align=center|14
|align=center|9
|align=center|
|align=center|
|align=center|
|align=center|
|-
|align=center|1939
|align=center|Union 5th / Rep 3rd
|align=center|4
|align=center|4
|align=center|2
|align=center|0
|align=center|2
|align=center|9
|align=center|8
|align=center|8
|align=center|
|align=center|
|align=center|
|align=center|
|-
|align=center|1940
|align=center|Union 5th / Rep 3rd
|align=center bgcolor=gold|1
|align=center|3
|align=center|3
|align=center|0
|align=center|0
|align=center|8
|align=center|5
|align=center|9
|align=center|
|align=center|
|align=center|
|align=center|
|}

Notable players
  Andriy Protsko
  Valeriy Kravchynskyi

See also
 List of Chernihiv Sport Teams
 FC Desna Chernihiv
 FC Desna-2 Chernihiv
 FC Desna-3 Chernihiv
 SDYuShOR Desna
 Yunist Chernihiv
 Lehenda Chernihiv

References

External links

Football clubs in Chernihiv
Football clubs in Chernihiv Oblast
Defunct football clubs in Ukraine
Association football clubs established in 1938
1938 establishments in Ukraine